Philip McCutchen (February 14, 1910 – October 7, 1964), credited on his records as The Cedar Creek Sheik, was an American hokum and blues singer and guitarist who recorded in the 1930s.

McCutchen was born in Suttons, Williamsburg County, South Carolina, near to Cedar Creek.  Little is known of his life.  His only recordings, of which ten tracks were issued, were made in Charlotte, North Carolina for Bluebird Records, on June 15, 1936.  Several of his recordings, including "Buy It From the Poultry Man (Cock For Sale)" and "I Believe Somebody's Ridin' My Mule", were bawdy examples of hokum music, while others mention local situations and personalities.  He sang in a "high, almost expressionless" voice, sometimes employing a yodel.  Though some critics have thought him to be a white rather than black performer, he is recorded as of "negro" race in census records.

McCutchen died at 7:55am on October 7, 1964.

Discography
Carolina Blues Guitar 1936-1951 (Old Tramp, 1988)

References

1910 births
1964 deaths
African-American guitarists
American blues guitarists
People from Williamsburg County, South Carolina
American male guitarists
20th-century American guitarists
20th-century African-American male singers